Since the 2022 Kherson counteroffensive, skirmishes have occurred in Kherson Oblast across the Dnieper River between the Armed Forces of Ukraine and the Russian Armed Forces throughout late 2022 and 2023.

Background 

Ukrainian officials estimated half of the Russian soldiers had been withdrawn across the Dnieper by the evening of 10 November. In the early morning of 11 November, Russian infantrymen were seen walking across a pontoon bridge to the eastern shore. Ukrainian armour and columns closed in on Kherson proper as they moved past several towns, villages and suburbs. As Russian troops retreated across the Dnipro river, Ukrainian troops went further into Kherson Oblast and surrounding areas.

Later that day, Ukrainian forces liberated Kherson and the rest of the right bank of Kherson Oblast.

Kinburn Spit

On 14 September, Ukraine attempted its first amphibious landing, which was unsuccessful. On the day following the attempted landing, Deputy Head of the Kherson Military-Civilian Administration Kirill Stremousov claimed that over 120 Ukrainian servicemen had been killed in the attack. The landing was never acknowledged by Ukraine, leading to differing accounts from different sources detailing the attack.

On 13 November, Ukrainian troops in Ochakiv attempted to land at Pokrovske after conducting limited raids and small boat landings in the days before. After a short battle with Russian forces, the landing group was destroyed and the landing failed.

On 14 November, Russian forces launched anti-aircraft missiles at Ochakiv in an attempt to disrupt Ukrainian fire control and delay future attempts at a landing.

On 16 November, Ukraine's Operational Command South reported that their forces had carried out more than 50 strikes around the spit to disrupt Russian shelling and electronic warfare originating from the area. The strikes reportedly killed 17 Russian troops and damaged 18 pieces of military equipment.

On 18 and 19 November, Ukrainian attacks on the spit continued, successfully targeting concentrations of Russian forces and equipment.

On 22 December, Volodymyr Saldo and another Russian source claimed that Ukrainian forces were regularly shelling the spit with long-range artillery and had destroyed a Russian port building there as a result, but that repeated attempts to land on the spit were still being repelled by Russian forces.

On 6 January 2023, a Russian milblogger claimed that Ukrainian reconnaissance activities were still continuing on the spit, which was supported by a follow up statement made by Nataliya Gumenyuk two days later.

Ostriv Velykyi Potomkin 

Following the 2022 Russian invasion of Ukraine, Ostriv Velykyi Potomkin came under Russian occupation in the early period of the conflict as a result of the Southern Ukraine campaign. During the counteroffensive, the island was liberated.

On 3 December, Ukraine announced the evacuation of citizens from the island due to Russian shelling, although due to weather conditions this did not materialize.

On 9 December, some Ukrainian officials and some unofficial Russian sources claimed that the 80th Arctic Motor Rifle Brigade, 25th Spetsnaz Regiment, and 4th BARS Special Combat Army Reserve, had re-occupied the island following a successful amphibious operation.

Contradicting Khlan, the General Staff of the Ukrainian Armed Forces claimed on 15 December that Russia had begun forcibly deporting civilians from Ostriv Velykyi Potomkin, affirming that Russian forces controlled the island.

On 2 January 2023, Ukrainian sources, including member of the Ukrainian parliament Oleksii Honcharenko, claimed that some or all of the island had been recaptured by Ukraine, and a video soon appeared online showing Ukrainian forces present in its northeastern portion.

This news was disputed by Russian sources, and was not officially confirmed by the Ukrainian government, with Serhii Khlan saying that such information existed but could not be confirmed. Footage was published showing Russian forces operating in nearby parts of the river delta, and a Russian military blogger claimed the island remained contested.

Incursions

First
On 3 December 2022, Ukrainian forces staged a limited incursion into the east bank. Soldiers from the Carlson air intelligence unit raised a Ukrainian flag on a port crane tower and liberated the surrounding territory.

Second
Throughout 23–24 January 2023, Ukrainian forces landed on the left-bank of the Dnieper River near Nova Kakhovka during an overnight raid. ISW stated that the raid "indicates that Russian forces may not have full control over the entire eastern shoreline of the Dnipro River."

Third
On 31 January 2023, Ukrainian forces landed on the left-bank of the river. They briefly established positions before Russian artillery forced them to leave. ISW reiterated that Russia may not have control over the shoreline, saying that Russian forces likely lacked full control over it. The next day, on 1 February, Ukrainian reconnaissance elements were reported to be near Lake Kruhlyk.

References

Battles of the 2022 Russian invasion of Ukraine
Battles in 2023
January 2023 events in Ukraine